Greenberg is a 2010 American comedy-drama film written and directed by Noah Baumbach. The film stars Ben Stiller, Greta Gerwig, Rhys Ifans, Brie Larson and Jennifer Jason Leigh. Greenberg was produced by Scott Rudin Productions and distributed by Focus Features. The film's soundtrack features the first film score by James Murphy.

Although the film received positive reviews, it was a box office bomb, grossing $7 million against a $25 million budget.

Plot
Florence Marr is a personal assistant to the Greenberg family in Hollywood Hills. Before the family leaves on a trip to Vietnam, Phillip Greenberg explains his brother, Roger will be staying at the house, ostensibly to build a doghouse for their pet, Mahler. Phillip's wife, Carol confides that Roger has just been released from a hospital after a nervous breakdown.

Arriving from New York City, Roger has an awkward encounter with Florence, and spends his time building the doghouse, watching neighbors swim in the Greenbergs’ pool, and writing various letters of complaint. His Welsh friend Ivan Schrank invites him to a party at the home of their former bandmate Eric Beller, where Roger is uncomfortable and Eric is openly hostile. Roger runs into Beth, an ex-girlfriend, explaining he is in Los Angeles to simply do nothing for a while.

Roger calls Florence to meet for a drink. He does not drive so she picks him up, stopping at her apartment for her purse. They begin to have sex, but Florence stops him, having just come out of a long relationship and not wanting to have meaningless sex. Roger suggests they keep things platonic and she agrees, but they remain drawn to each other.

Over dinner, Eric vents that Roger declined a major record deal for their band fifteen years ago. He marvels that Ivan, devastated by losing the contract, still speaks to him.

Noticing Mahler is lethargic, Roger calls Florence to take them to a vet, where they learn he has an auto-immune disease. Their relationship soon escalates, with Florence falling for Roger despite his outbursts and awkwardness.

Roger meets Beth for drinks and recalls minute details from their time together, which she barely remembers; she leaves abruptly when Roger tries to rekindle their relationship.

After Florence and Roger finally have sex, he yells at her for pursuing him when he does not want to become involved. The next day, a remorseful Roger calls Florence, who confesses that she is due to have an abortion the following day. Roger offers to take her; since he does not drive, Ivan drives them to the clinic, where she undergoes general anaesthesia and stays overnight.

Back at the house, Roger's college-age niece, Sara has turned up. Leaving for Australia in the morning with her friend, Muriel, they throw a house party with dozens of their friends, with whom Roger does drugs. Ivan arrives and gets into an argument with Roger, finally voicing his feelings over their lost record deal. Roger confesses he had no idea his personal concerns would end the band, for which he feels immense guilt. They bemoan that they have ended up in lives they did not plan to have, though Ivan has made peace with his. Having learned from Florence that Roger had been hospitalized, and having been through a similar experience himself, Ivan laments that they could have helped each other. He leaves, declaring that they never truly talk, and saddened Roger never made an effort to know Ivan's son. Dejected and inebriated, Roger leaves a long voicemail for Florence, confessing that he really likes her.

The next day, Roger jumps at Sara's invitation to accompany her to Australia. He convinces the neighbors to take care of Mahler, but on the way to the airport, changes his mind. Instead, he goes to meet Florence at the clinic, and they return to her apartment. The film closes as she listens to Roger's voicemail.

Cast

Production
The story was developed by Jennifer Jason Leigh and Noah Baumbach. In a departure from Baumbach’s previous New York-set films, the story was to be set in Los Angeles. 

Ben Stiller was cast as the titular Greenberg, having been a fan of Baumbach’s work. Said Stiller, "Noah’s work is very detailed and goes into specifics on the characters; it’s all written on the page. We rehearsed a lot; it really has to be said as written. So there was hardly any improvisation on the shoot and that was exciting – not having the burden of having to come up with something to try to make it better. What I had to do was to make sure that I would get the rhythm of his dialogue, his lines, to work. Some sequences – 4-6 pages in the script – were like doing little plays." The film was the first of multiple collaborations between Stiller and Baumbach.

Principal photography was completed within seven weeks. Specific Los Angeles locations were written into the film, including Lucy’s El Adobe restaurant, the Runyon Canyon hiking trails, the Fairfax district along Melrose Avenue, and the Highland Gardens Hotel.

Soundtrack

The soundtrack is arranged by DFA Records co-founder James Murphy. It is Murphy's debut film score, and it includes original compositions credited to Murphy, his band LCD Soundsystem as well as songs by other artists. The movie itself contained 25 unique songs, leaving 8 out of the soundtrack.

 Track listing

 Steve Miller Band: "Jet Airliner"
 James Murphy: "People"
 Nite Jewel: "Suburbia"
 James Murphy: "Sleepy Baby"
 James Murphy: "Thumbs"
 Albert Hammond: "It Never Rains in Southern California"
 James Murphy: "Plenty of Time"
 James Murphy: "Photographs"
 James Murphy: "Gente"
 Galaxie 500: "Strange"
 LCD Soundsystem: "Oh You (Christmas Blues)"
 James Murphy: "Birthday Song"
 James Murphy: "Dear You"
 The Sonics: "Shot Down"
 Duran Duran: "The Chauffeur"
 James Murphy: "If You Need a Friend"
 James Murphy : "Please Don't Follow Me"
 James Murphy: "Photographs (Piano)"

Reception

Critical response
On review aggregator Rotten Tomatoes, the film has an approval rating of 76% based on 176 reviews. The site's critical consensus reads: "Greenberg'''s title character is harder to like than most, but Ben Stiller's nuanced performance and a darkly funny script help take the misanthropic edge off." On Metacritic, the film has a weighted average score of 76 out of 100, based on 39 critics, indicating "generally favorable reviews."

Roger Ebert gave the film  stars out of four. Ebert praised Stiller's performance and wrote: "I never knew who Ben Stiller was born to play, but now I do." Peter Travers of Rolling Stone magazine, gave the film 3 out of 4 stars and wrote, "Writer-director Noah Baumbach (The Squid and the Whale) walks the fragile line between humor and heartbreak...Even when you laugh, like in the climactic party scene, it hurts." Ann Hornaday of The Washington Post'' called the film "a quietly funny portrait of grown-ups growing up" and gave it 3 out of 4 stars. Hornaday praised the lead performances, noting "Stiller inhabits his character's neuroses so thoroughly that it's easy to forget what a challenge it is to make such misanthropy the least bit compelling" and said Gerwig "proves her bona fides here as a fine, engaging young actress."

Not all reviews were positive. Kurt Loder of MTV News wrote, "The movie is set up as a quirky romance between two lost souls, but in the end it seems more like a stalemate than a love match." David Edelstein of New York magazine lamented: "Greenberg would be a heckuva movie if we could just get Greenberg out of there."

Accolades

Berlin International Film Festival
 Golden Bear Award for Best Film (nominated)

Gotham Awards
 Breakthrough Actor/Actress – Greta Gerwig (nominated)

Independent Spirit Awards
 Best Feature (nominated)
 Best Male Lead – Ben Stiller (nominated)
 Best Female Lead – Greta Gerwig (nominated)
 Best Cinematography – Harris Savides (nominated)

National Board of Review Awards
 Top Ten Independent Films

References

External links

 
 
 
 

2010 films
2010 comedy-drama films
2010 independent films
American comedy-drama films
Films directed by Noah Baumbach
Films set in Los Angeles
Films shot in Los Angeles
Focus Features films
Films produced by Scott Rudin
2010s English-language films
2010s American films